St. Augustine Saints were a professional minor league baseball team that played primarily in the Florida State League, winning two league titles. The team did play however for two seasons in the Southeastern League. During World War II, Saints' pitching phenom, Forrest "Lefty" Brewer was one of 5 men, who played minor-league or semipro ball, to die while taking place in the D-Day Invasion. Brewer had pitched a no-hitter for the Saints in the 1938 season.

During the 1927 season, the team was briefly known as the Waycross Saints.

The Saints folded on June 1, 1952. A newspaper report cited "poor attendance and a lack of funds." The club had a 10–37 record at the time.

References

External links
Baseball Reference

Defunct Florida State League teams
Baseball teams established in 1926
Baseball teams disestablished in 1952
1926 establishments in Florida
1952 disestablishments in Florida
St. Augustine, Florida
Chicago Cubs minor league affiliates
Defunct baseball teams in Florida
Waycross, Georgia micropolitan area